The α-aminoadipate pathway is a biochemical pathway for the synthesis of the amino acid L-lysine. In the eukaryotes, this pathway is unique to the higher fungi (containing chitin in their cell walls) and the euglenids. It has also been reported from bacteria of the genus Thermus.

Pathway overview

Homocitrate is initially synthesised from acetyl-CoA and 2-oxoglutarate by homocitrate synthase. This is then converted to homoaconitate by homoaconitase and then to homoisocitrate by homoisocitrate dehydrogenase. A nitrogen atom is added from glutamate by aminoadipate aminotransferase to form the α-aminoadipate from which this pathway gets its name. This is then reduced by aminoadipate reductase via an acyl-enzyme intermediate to a semialdehyde. Reaction with glutamate by one class of saccharopine dehydrogenase yields saccharopine which is then cleaved by a second saccharopine dehydrogenase to yield lysine and oxoglutarate.

α-Aminoadipic acid

α-Aminoadipic acid is the conjugate acid of α-aminoadipate, the latter of which is the prevalent form at physiological pH. A 2013 study identified α-Aminoadipic acid (2-aminoadipic acid) as a novel predictor of the development of diabetes and suggested that it is a potential modulator of glucose homeostasis in humans.

See also
 Adipic acid

References

Metabolism
Biosynthesis
Metabolic pathways
Dicarboxylic acids
Amino acids